Dentalium longitrorsum is a species of tusk shell, a marine scaphopod mollusk in the family Dentaliidae.

Description
The shell is a slender and long, about 100mm. It is white with a slight curve and the openings at both ends are circular.

References

Scaphopods
Molluscs described in 1842